Callala Bay is a small town on the South Coast of New South Wales, Australia in the City of Shoalhaven.

The town is situated on the northern shore of Jervis Bay about 20 minutes drive from Nowra and 10 minutes from Culburra Beach. Nearby settlements include Callala Beach and Myola to the south-west, Currarong to the south-east and Culburra Beach to the north-east.

Local facilities and community activities include:
 a safe harbour
 jetty
 sailing club
 boat ramp
 medical centre
 primary school
 child care and pre-school centre
 faith groups
 soccer club
 skateboard park
 netball/basketball courts
 community centre (available for hire)
 NSW Rural Fire Service - Callala Bay
 a small shopping centre (Australia Post, supermarket, chemist, baker, butcher, cafe, take away, real estate agents, cellars)  
 shared pathway around the headland
 small group activities (aqua exercise group, craft, folk dance, yoga, over 50s' social group, garden club, Writers, Bushcare)
 regular bus service to Nowra, including for high school students.
Profile statistics used by Shoalhaven City Council for planning purposes are located here

Callala Bay is a short drive or flat bike ride from the popular Club Callala (Callala RSL Country Club) which hosts a challenging 18 hole golf course, two bowling greens, great food and nightly entertainment.

Sport and recreation
Club Callala
Beachsafe Callala Bay
Callala Beach Triathlon
Callala Bay Tennis Court

References

External links
Callala Bay Community Association Incorporated
Callala Community Centre
NSW Rural Fire Service - Callala Bay
Creating Callala ~ 2013 Strategic Plan
Callala Beach Progress Association
VISITNSW.com - Callala-Bay

Towns in the South Coast (New South Wales)
City of Shoalhaven
Bays of New South Wales